Paul Burling is a British impressionist.  A veteran of show business for 25 years, having worked in voiceover, radio and pantomime, he rose to national attention as a finalist of the fourth series of Britain's Got Talent.  His debut television show in 2010, It's Paul Burling! attracted a television audience of 3.7 million.

Biographical details
Paul Burling was born in Hertfordshire, now lives in Bristol and is a father of three.

Career
Burling "worked the holiday parks and comedy circuit for 25 years" before attracting nationwide attention on the fourth series of Britain's Got Talent.  He has worked in voiceover, for radio and in pantomime before being given his own Christmas special show by ITV, a prime-time national television spot.

His role of Christmas 2010 in Jack and the Beanstalk, was his fifth pantomime season at the Central Theatre, Chatham.  He has also played Wishee Washee in Aladdin and Smee in Peter Pan.  In 2011 he co-starred with Gareth Gates in Aladdin at the Milton Keynes Theatre.<ref>Milton Keynes website . Accessed 30 December 2011.</r/miltonkeynes.com/geniue-us-casting-as-gareth-gates-and-paul-burling-announced-to-star-in-aladdin-at-milton-keynes-theatre.html Milton Keynes website]. Accessed 30 December 2011.</ref>

The last 3 years has seen Paul in pantomime with Strictly judge Craig Revel Horwood, in Southend, Dartford & High Wycombe all with Qdos Pantomimes.

Burling's radio work includes BBC Radio Kent, Devon and Wales, Pulse FM and Ocean FM, and he is an experienced voiceover artist.

On Britain's Got Talent, Burling became particularly associated with his impression of television comic Harry Hill. His show for ITV, It's Paul Burling! aired in December 2010 to a television audience of 3.7 million viewers. His expanded portfolio included impressions and satires of Alan Carr, Graham Norton, Downton Abbey, Hercule Poirot, and The X Factor. Starring alongside Paul was actress & impressionist Jess Robinson, responsible for the female impression on ITV's Headcases. Subsequently, the iPhone 3GS made an app called "Burling's Game Booth". Other TV work includes The Slammer for CBBC during 2011.

In 2013 he made his feature film debut in The Harry Hill Movie playing Harry Hill's and Matt Lucas's father.

During 2015, Paul Burling toured with Joe Pasquale visiting cities and towns throughout southern and eastern England.

In 2015 it was confirmed that Paul would be part of the new Butlins pantomimes Aladdin Rocks, which was shown every week and it carried on into 2016 season at all three parks. Aladdin Rocks came to an end in January 2017. Burling did not return for Butlins new pantomime Whittington Rocks in 2017 instead went back to Qdos Pantomimes and starred in Peter Pan in Belfast.

References

1970 births
Living people
English impressionists (entertainers)
Britain's Got Talent contestants
English male comedians
Television personalities from Bristol
Place of birth missing (living people)
20th-century English comedians
21st-century English comedians